"Jumpin' Right In" is a song recorded by Canadian country music artist Jim Witter. It was released in 1999 as the second single from his second studio album, All My Life. It peaked at number 10 on the RPM Country Tracks chart in September 1999.

Chart performance

Year-end charts

References

1999 songs
1999 singles
Jim Witter songs
Curb Records singles
Songs written by Rory Bourke
Songs written by Jim Witter